The 1995–96 Scottish First Division season began on 12 August 1995.

Overview
The 1995–96 Scottish First Division season ended in success for Dunfermline Athletic who won the title by four points from nearest rivals Dundee United.

Promotion and relegation from 1994–95
Promoted from First Division to Premier Division
Raith Rovers

Relegated from Premier Division to First Division
Dundee United

Table

References

See also
1995–96 in Scottish football

Scottish First Division seasons
Scot
2